All My Love is South Korean boy band SS501's second full length Japanese studio album. The album was released on May 13, 2009 by Pony Canyon.

Although they were doing a cappella performances during their past years before, it was their first time to record and include an a cappella title track to their album, "All My Love". Aside from the title track, the album also consists of another twelve tracks, including their track "Lucky Days" from their Lucky Days single.

A promotional tour was held in Japan in support of the album.

Track listing

Music videos
 "Lucky Days"

Release history

References

External links 

 

SS501 albums
2007 albums